Danger Close may refer to:
 A call for fire in directing artillery
 Danger Close: The Battle of Long Tan, a 2019 Australian film
 Danger Close Games, a defunct development studio of Electronic Arts